The Thouet is a tributary of the Loire in the Nouvelle-Aquitaine and Pays de la Loire regions of western France. The Thouet rises at Secondigny, close to the source of the Sèvre Nantaise, and joins the Loire just to the west of Saumur.

The river's name derives from the ancient Gallic word for tranquil.

Course of the river

The Thouet rises in the Gâtine Vendéenne, the most southern outcrop of the Armorican Massif, at  altitude. The Armorican Massif is made up of volcanic and metamorphic rocks dating back to the Paleozoic era. This impermeable land does not result in any important aquifers but is an area of significant rainfall runoff. From the source to Parthenay the river flows in a generally east–west direction.

To the east of Parthenay, the river turns north and flows on a generally northward heading for the rest of its course. Between Saint-Loup-Lamairé and Thouars, the river flows onto the Paris Basin, an area of sedimentary rocks where successive marine deposits of periods from the Triassic to the Pliocene were laid down. The nature of the rocks here allows the formation of an aquifer whose water reserves support the river in times of low flow.

In order downstream, the Thouet flows through:

 Secondigny
 Azay-sur-Thouet
 le Tallud
 Parthenay
 Châtillon-sur-Thouet
 Gourgé
 Saint-Loup-Lamairé
 Airvault
 Saint-Généroux
 Missé
 Thouars
 Taizon
 Saint-Martin-de-Sanzay
 Montreuil-Bellay
 Saint-Just-sur-Dive
 Saumur

The principal tributaries of the River Thouet are:

 The Viette, at Parthenay on the right bank
 The Palais, at Parthenay on the left bank
 The Cébron, at Saint-Loup-Lamairé on the left bank
 The Thouaret, near Taizé on the left bank
 The Argenton, at Saint-Martin-de-Sanzay on the left bank
 The Losse, at Montreuil-Bellay on the right bank
 The Dive, at Saint-Just-sur-Dive on the right bank.

For much of its length, the Thouet is paralleled by the GR 36 long-distance walking route, which connects Ouistreham, on the coast of the English Channel, with Bourg-Madame, on the border with Spain. This stretch of the path traces the footsteps of pilgrims from Brittany and Normandy on their way to Santiago de Compostela, and in places crosses the river using the same fords, packhorse bridges and stepping stones the pilgrims would have used.

Navigation

The Thouet was once navigable between its confluence with the Loire and Montreuil-Bellay. The first mention of navigation on the river dates from 1430 when an assembly of merchants in Saumur suggested the creation of a navigation over this stretch of the river, requiring the creation of passages through three mill weirs. It is possible that boats were already carrying goods on the river before that date, the cargo being transferred between boats at each obstacle.

King Charles VII authorised the start of work by letters patent, financing the work by allowing the lords of Montreuil-Bellay to raise a tax on wine that would pass through their land. In the 15th and 16th centuries, the passage through the weirs probably took the form of flash locks. The later pound lock may have been introduced towards the end of the 16th century, and it is known that three pound locks were in use on the river by 1608. A project to make the river navigable up to Thouars was proposed in 1746 but was never executed.

The Dive, a tributary of the Thouet, was canalised in 1834 to create the Canal de la Dive. As part of this development, two modern pound locks with straight sides and mitred gates were built on the Thouet, downstream of the confluence with the Dive. A third modern lock was built at the same time on the Thouet, but upstream from the confluence of the Dive.

However the new navigation soon faced competition from better roads and the railway, which appeared in the region in 1874. The maximum boat size imposed by the locks proved insufficient, and a proposed enlargement to the larger Freycinet gauge was never realized. The last commercial navigation on the river was in 1920.

References

External links

A description of the Thouet and its valley from France Magazine.

Rivers of France
Rivers of Nouvelle-Aquitaine
Rivers of Pays de la Loire
Rivers of Deux-Sèvres
Rivers of Maine-et-Loire